The Valle Alto Formation (Jva) is a geological formation of the Central Ranges of the Colombian Andes. The formation is composed of shales, sandstones and conglomerates and dates to the Late Jurassic period. Ammonites and fossil flora have been found in the Valle Alto Formation.

Etymology 
The formation was described and named in 1977 by González et al. after Hacienda Valle Alto, San Félix, Caldas.

Lithologies 
The Valle Alto Formation is composed of shales, sandstones and conglomerates.

Stratigraphy, age and depositional environment 
The Valle Alto Formation, part of the Quebradagrande Complex, is not defined as a proper formation, rather as a collection of rocks of different facies origin segmented by tectonic forces of the Central Ranges.

The Valle Alto Formation has been deposited as the result of marine incursions from the proto-Caribbean into Colombia, preceding the larger-scale transgression of the Cretaceous.

Fossil content 
Fossils of Piazopteris branneri, Cladophlebis sp., Classopollis sp., Ctenozamites sp., Desmiophyllum sp., Gleichenites sp., Nilssoniopteris sp., Otozamites sp., Pachypteris sp., Ptilophyllum sp., Rhabdoderas sp., Sagenopteris sp., Sandlingites sp., Sphenopteris sp., Substeuroceras sp., Trigonia sp., and Zamites sp. have been found in the Valle Alto Formation.

Outcrops 

The Valle Alto Formation is found near its type locality in the Central Ranges of the Colombian Andes, around Pácora and Salamina.

See also 

 Geology of the Eastern Hills
 Geology of the Ocetá Páramo
 Geology of the Altiplano Cundiboyacense

Notes

References

Bibliography

Maps 
 

Geologic formations of Colombia
Jurassic System of South America
Jurassic Colombia
Tithonian Stage
Fossiliferous stratigraphic units of South America
Paleontology in Colombia
Sandstone formations
Shale formations
Shallow marine deposits
Formations